The 1978–79 WHL season was the 13th season for the Western Hockey League.  Twelve teams completed a 72-game season.  The Brandon Wheat Kings won the President's Cup.

League notes
The league shortened its name to the Western Hockey League.
The Flin Flon Bombers relocated to Edmonton, Alberta to become the second incarnation of the Edmonton Oil Kings.

Regular season

Final standings

Scoring leaders
Note: GP = Games played; G = Goals; A = Assists; Pts = Points; PIM = Penalties in minutes

1979 WHL Playoffs

Division semi-finals
Round robin format

Brandon (7–1) advanced
Saskatoon (3–5) advanced
Edmonton (2–6) eliminated
Lethbridge (5–3) advanced
Calgary (4–4) advanced
Billings (3–5) eliminated
Portland (7–1) advanced
Victoria (3–5) advanced
New Westminster (2–6) eliminated

Division finals
Brandon defeated Saskatoon 4 games to 0
Lethbridge defeated Calgary 4 games to 3
Portland defeated Victoria 4 games to 3

League semi-finals
Round Robin format

Brandon (3–1) advanced
Portland (3–1) advanced
Lethbridge (0–4) eliminated

WHL Championship
Brandon defeated Portland 4 games to 2

All-Star game

There was no All-Star game in 1978–79.

WHL awards

All-Star Teams

See also
1979 Memorial Cup
1979 NHL Entry Draft
1978 in sports
1979 in sports

References
whl.ca
 2005–06 WHL Guide

Western Hockey League seasons
WCHL
WCHL